is a passenger railway station in the city of Kiryū, Gunma, Japan, operated by the private railway operator Jōmō Electric Railway Company.

Lines

Station layout
The station has one side platform serving traffic in both directions. The station is unattended.

Adjacent stations

History
Maruyamashita Station was opened on November 10, 1928.

Passenger statistics
In fiscal 2019, the station was used by an average of 53 passengers daily (boarding passengers only).

Surrounding area
 Watarase River

See also
 List of railway stations in Japan

References

External links

  
	

Stations of Jōmō Electric Railway
Railway stations in Gunma Prefecture
Railway stations in Japan opened in 1928
Kiryū, Gunma